Just Us is the second studio album (third overall) of South Korean band JYJ. The album was released digitally on July 29, 2014 and physically on August 1, 2014, by C-JeS Entertainment. American singer Chris Brown also produced a song for the album.

Track listing

Music videos
 Back Seat

Release history

Chart positions

Sales

References

2014 albums
JYJ albums
Kakao M albums
Contemporary R&B albums by South Korean artists